The 2012 Saarland state election was held in on 25 March 2012 to elect the members of the Landtag of Saarland. The election was triggered by the collapse of the previous coalition government comprising the Christian Democratic Union (CDU) led by Minister-President Annegret Kramp-Karrenbauer, Free Democratic Party (FDP), and The Greens. The CDU subsequently formed a grand coalition with the Social Democratic Party (SPD), and Kramp-Karrenbauer was re-elected as Minister-President.

Background
After the 2009 state election, a Jamaica coalition (CDU–FDP–Green) government took office, the first of its kind in Germany. The government collapsed on 6 January 2012 due to internal issues in the FDP. Minister-President Kramp-Karrenbauer stated that "[a] credible and reliable cooperation is no longer completely possible in this coalition." The CDU held discussions with the Social Democratic Party in an attempt to form a grand coalition, but this failed, causing early elections to be called.

Parties
The table below lists parties represented in the previous Landtag of Saarland.

Opinion polling

Election result

|-
| colspan=8| 
|-
! colspan="2" | Party
! Votes
! %
! +/-
! Seats 
! +/-
! Seats %
|-
| bgcolor=| 
| align=left | Christian Democratic Union (CDU)
| align=right| 169,617
| align=right| 35.2
| align=right| 0.7
| align=right| 19
| align=right| 0
| align=right| 37.3
|-
| bgcolor=| 
| align=left | Social Democratic Party (SPD)
| align=right| 147,170
| align=right| 30.6
| align=right| 6.1
| align=right| 17
| align=right| 4
| align=right| 33.3
|-
| bgcolor=| 
| align=left | The Left (Linke)
| align=right| 77,612
| align=right| 16.1
| align=right| 5.2
| align=right| 9
| align=right| 2
| align=right| 17.6
|-
| bgcolor=| 
| align=left | Pirate Party (Piraten)
| align=right| 35,656
| align=right| 7.4
| align=right| 7.4
| align=right| 4
| align=right| 4
| align=right| 7.8
|-
| bgcolor=| 
| align=left | Alliance 90/The Greens (Grüne)
| align=right| 24,252
| align=right| 5.0
| align=right| 0.9
| align=right| 2
| align=right| 1
| align=right| 3.9
|-
! colspan=8|
|-
| bgcolor=| 
| align=left | Family Party of Germany (FAMILIE)
| align=right| 8,394
| align=right| 1.7
| align=right| 0.3
| align=right| 0
| align=right| ±0
| align=right| 0
|-
| bgcolor=| 
| align=left | Free Democratic Party (FDP)
| align=right| 5,871
| align=right| 1.2
| align=right| 8.0
| align=right| 0
| align=right| 5
| align=right| 0
|-
| bgcolor=| 
| align=left | National Democratic Party (NPD)
| align=right| 5,606
| align=right| 1.2
| align=right| 0.3
| align=right| 0
| align=right| ±0
| align=right| 0
|-
| bgcolor=|
| align=left | Others
| align=right| 7,116
| align=right| 1.5
| align=right| 
| align=right| 0
| align=right| ±0
| align=right| 0
|-
! align=right colspan=2| Total
! align=right| 481,294
! align=right| 100.0
! align=right| 
! align=right| 51
! align=right| ±0
! align=right| 
|-
! align=right colspan=2| Voter turnout
! align=right| 
! align=right| 61.6
! align=right| 6.0
! align=right| 
! align=right| 
! align=right| 
|}

Outcome
Having been reelected as the largest party in the Landtag, CDU was tasked with forming the government. Minister-President Annegret Kramp-Karrenbauer said that she was seeking to form a grand coalition with the SPD, which have 37 seats altogether. Both parties reached a coalition agreement on 24 April 2012. The CDU and SPD would control 3 ministries each. Kramp-Karrenbauer will also head the new government which will be sworn on 9 May 2012.

On 9 May 2012 Kramp-Karrenbauer's new government gained the vote of confidence with 37 votes. There was 12 votes against and 2 abstentions. Her cabinet was later endorsed by the Landtag with the same number of votes.

References 

Saarland
2012